Russkaya Kara (Urıś Qara) is a rural locality (a village) in Kazanchinsky Selsoviet, Askinsky District, Bashkortostan, Russia. The population was 3 as of 2010. There is 1 street.

Geography 
Russkaya Kara is located 42 km northwest of Askino (the district's administrative centre) by road. Mikhaylovka is the nearest rural locality.

References 

Rural localities in Askinsky District